The Grande Bibliothèque du Québec (GBQ) was a public corporation of the province of Quebec, Canada.  It came into existence in 1998 and merged with Bibliothèque nationale du Québec in 2002.  Its purpose was to plan the creation of the Grande Bibliothèque.

See also
 Bibliothèque et Archives nationales du Québec
 Literature of Quebec

External links
 BAnQ's Official Website (in French, with English summary)

References
 Bibliothèque nationale du Québec: Direction des communications et des relations publiques. Here Is Your Grande Bibliothèque. Montréal: Bibliothèque nationale du Québec: printing [by] Québécor, 2005. N.B.: Published (also in French) on the occasion of the "Open House", on 30 April and 1 May 2005, Montréal, that launched the Grande Bibliothèque du Québec. 

Public libraries in Quebec
Libraries in Montreal
Crown corporations of Quebec
Libraries established in 1998
1998 establishments in Canada